Atsuhiro (written: 厚裕, 淳宏, 淳弘 or 貴丈) is a masculine Japanese given name. Notable people with the name include:

, Japanese actor
, Japanese footballer
, Japanese footballer
, Japanese video game composer
Atsuhiro Sawai (born 1939), Japanese yoga teacher

Japanese masculine given names